To understand is to achieve understanding.

Understand may also refer to:

Music
 Understand?, an album by Naked Raygun, 1989
 "Understand" (Melanie C song), 2008
 "My Generation"/"Understand", a single by Yui, 2007
 "Understand", a song by Christina Aguilera from Back to Basics, 2006
 "Understand", a song by Jacques Greene from Dawn Chorus, 2019
 "Understand", a song by Jeremy Camp from Stay, 2002
 "Understand", a song by Shawn Mendes from Illuminate, 2016
 "Understand", a song by Yourcodenameis:milo from They Came from the Sun, 2007

Other uses
 Understand (software), a software development platform
 "Understand" (story), a 1991 novelette by Ted Chiang

See also
 I Understand (disambiguation)
 Understanding (disambiguation)